Jonathon Adams (born October 2, 1990) is a Cree-Métis (Nêhiyaw-Michif), Two-spirit baritone vocalist from Edmonton (amiskwaciwâskahikan). They specialize in early and baroque music.

Early life and education 
Adams was born in Edmonton, Alberta, and raised by an adoptive white settler family. They attended secondary school at the Victoria School Of Performing And Visual Arts, graduating as part of the class of 2008. In their early twenties, Adams began to reconnect with his indigenous heritage his biological mother who was from the Bigstone Cree Nation.

Adams would go on to study at the Royal Academy of Music in London, the Conservatorium van Amsterdam (to pursue a Masters degree in Early Music vocals), and the Victoria Conservatory of Music in Victoria, British Columbia. They have also studied under the tutelage of Nancy Argenta, Emma Kirkby, and Edith Wiens.

Career
They have performed as a soloist alongside the San Francisco Symphony directed by Masaaki Suzuki, Philippe Herreweghe, and Sigiswald Kuijken. Adams has also performed with the Toronto Symphony Orchestra, the Amsterdam Baroque Orchestra & Choir, and the New York Philharmonic. They are a Netherlands Bach Society fellow. 

They were invited to the University of Toronto as an Artist-in-Residence from 2022-2023 for the school's Early Music Department.

Adams is currently based in Montreal.

References 

1990 births
Living people
Canadian baritones
Métis musicians
Musicians from Edmonton
Cree people
Two-spirit people
Conservatorium van Amsterdam alumni
Alumni of the Royal Academy of Music
Canadian LGBT musicians